May E. Scheve Reardon (born June 27, 1964) is a former American Democrat politician who served in the Missouri House of Representatives.  Born in St. Louis, Missouri, she graduated from Saint Louis University and Webster University.

She got started in politics by volunteering to help the presidential campaign of Richard Gephardt. She became the youngest woman elected to the General Assembly and became the first woman to run the Missouri Lottery.

References

1964 births
Living people
20th-century American politicians
21st-century American politicians
20th-century American women politicians
21st-century American women politicians
Democratic Party members of the Missouri House of Representatives
Women state legislators in Missouri